Gairo, Gàiru in Sardinian, is a comune (municipality) in the Province of Nuoro in the Italian region Sardinia, located about  northeast of Cagliari and about  southwest of Tortolì.

Gairo was originally constructed on unstable ground. Starting in 1951, buildings began to collapse.  This led to the abandonment of the original location and re-building at an uphill location.  The original village, known as "Gairo Vecchio", or "Old Gairo", is open to visitors.

Gairo borders the following municipalities: Arzana, Cardedu, Jerzu, Lanusei, Osini, Seui, Tertenia, Ulassai, Ussassai.

History 
Current location of Gairo is due to a flood in 1951 that forced people to abandon the old village and to build a new one. The move was completed in 1969. Part of the population of the old village was other wise forced to move to the lowlands and built the village of Cardedu (municipality on its own since 1984).The old village is still located 2 km south from the new one. It is a village dating back to the 14th century and it is known as Gairo Vecchio. It is one of the most famous abandoned places in Sardinia and in Italy.

Local people use to crowd it again once a year, on the 17–20 August period, to celebrate Saint Elena, patroness of the village. In that occasion not only religious celebrations have place but also big parties with traditional food (sa cocoi) and the old Carnival, Su Maimulu, one of the most particular Carnival of all Sardinia (it has its raisins in the pre-Christian and pre-Roman era).

The municipality is also known for the archeological sites of Serbissi (together with Osini, a big nuraghe built on the top of a mountain and on the top of a natural cave, originally used to store food) and Is Tostoinus.

Nature 
Gairo's territory is also famous for its natural beauties. Perd'e Liana, for instance, is one of the most important and evocative morphological conformations in Sardinia. It is a natural monument constituted by a vertical tower, a so-called heel or "tonneri" in Sardinian, that races skywards. At 1293 m, it is one of the best known natural monuments on the island for its strange appearance. It is slender and elegant in form and is two kilometres from the edge of the highland of Tonneri. 

The highest part of the heel is about fifty metres wide but has vertical walls that rise 100 metres. The light-coloured sides of its walls contrast with the greyness of the rocks that surround it. Its base is in a conical trunk conformation. For the Ogliastra region, this natural monument constitutes the most important evidence of erosion of the large calcareous strata of the Giurese that has covered this part of the island for about ten million years and, being visible over a long distance, constituted a reference point for all those that crossed these mountain zones in times gone by.

It was considered as a holy mountain by the Nuragic people inhabiting the zone. Its name seems to be linked to the name given by the Romans to the old tribe inhabiting the zone: Ilienses (literally, "the stone of Ilienses"). This people resisted to Roman occupation for centuries.

Another beauty in Gairo's territory is the famous beach of Su Sirboni.

Language 
Apart from Italian, learnt at school, local people speak a dialect of Sardinian language, Gairese, belonging to ogliastrino-campidanese variant of Sardinian languages.

Traditions

Gairo hosts one of the most particular Carnivals of all Sardinia: Su Maimulu.

Like all Sardinian Carnivals, in the Carnival period people use to wear horrific masks and to represent an ancestral fight between the wild nature and the community, between the Good and the Bad. This representations have their raisins in the pagan era, before than Roman and Christian arrive. They are deeply linked to the rural life and to the hopes of ols communities inhabiting the zone. 

During these representation, a bad character (s'urtzu ballabeni), wearing sheepskins and an horrific mask, advances through the village attacking and scaring everybody with an aggressive mood. He represents wild nature and winter in particular. He is the representation of how winter used to attack rural communities.

This character is put on chains by other characters, the good ones (is ). These characters represent good spirits protecting the community. They also wear animal skins and animal heads (cows, sheep, goats or other horned animals) and lot of bells in their back. During the representation they advance with a regular rhythm (given by the bells on their backs) and beat the bad character, forcing him to follow their rhythm.

The meaning of this representation was a hope of the whole community: wild nature dancing at the rhythm they wanted (with regular rains etc...).
This representation ends with good characters hardly beating and killing the bad character (because of his refusal to follow the rhythm). It is the end of winter and the beginning of celebrations involving the whole community. However, while these big celebrations are having place, the bad character raise again and begins attacking everybody, once more. This was to remind the community that they do not have to celebrate too much: their win is only a temporary win and next year a new fight will be required to survive.

This is only the main scene, but other characters appear during the representation ( etc...). Everyone has a particular meaning and acts following a given screenplay (hand down for centuries through tellings of the elderly)

The Carnival period usually begins on the 17 January (Saint Anthony celebrations), with an enormous falò in the main square of the village. During this day a person (s'omini 'e faci) assumes the responsibility of organizing Carnival in front of the community and masks start blackening their faces in a solemn atmosphere.

During the evening wild boars are roasted by the hunters of the village and are offered to the peasantry and to the visitors.

That day is the beginning of Carnival, a crazy period which lasts almost a month, until the Ash Wednesday. Apart from the starting day (usually the 17th of January), the main day for celebrations is called Marti Perra (25 February).

Legends 

The most famous legend linked to the village is that of Sa Babaieca. According to this legend, old people aged 70 used to assume hallucinogen herbs (sa lua, euphorbia) and to reach a big rock south of the village accompanied by the oldest male son. Once they reached the rock, they used to jump down, as to avoid weighing down the community.

According to this legend, one guy, accompanying the old father, decided to forbid his father to jump and to bring him back home, hiding him to the rest of the community. Thanks to his wise advise for agriculture and life in general, he became in a while the richest person of the whole village. He decided than to tell everybody his secret and the tradition was stopped.

There are not historical evidences of these sacrifices, however the legend is still told to children as to teach them the importance of old people's words. Although they may appear as useless and boring, they must be considered as the real richness of the community.

The rock called Sa Babaieca is located one km South of the old village and it is open to visitors. The path to reach it is curiously called "Conch'e luas", literally "head of euphorbia" (the hallucinogen herb that according to the legend was assumed before than jumping from the rock).

Art 

There are many wall paintings on the village, which represent daily life of the community. The one in the main square is painted by M. Casula.

Particular is the painting representing one mask of the old Carnival, "Su Maimulu de Gairu", painted by A. Ascedu.

There are also sculptures representing soldiers fallen during WWI and again Su Maimulu. Both are made by A. Diana.

Demographic evolution

References

Cities and towns in Sardinia